The CU convoys were a World War II series of fast trans-Atlantic convoys to the British Isles.  The earliest convoys of the series were tankers sailing directly from petroleum refineries at Curaçao to the United Kingdom. Most convoys of the series assembled in New York City and included fast freighters and troopships, with tankers arriving from Aruba via TAG convoys to Guantánamo Bay and GN convoys from Guantánamo to New York.

Background
Allied war materials had been transported from North America to the United Kingdom in HX convoys since 1939 and in slower SC convoys since 1940. These convoys were escorted by the Royal Navy and Royal Canadian Navy. The United States Navy provided a few escorts to HX and SC convoys from September 1941 through April 1943.

CU convoys were established as an emergency measure to maintain petroleum fuel reserves in the United Kingdom for continued strategic bombing of Europe following heavy tanker losses along the east coast of North America during the Second Happy Time. Modern tankers could travel faster than the  HX convoys, and the CU convoys were continued as a very fast convoy series along the HX convoy route. United States destroyer escorts provided anti-submarine screens for CU convoys because the s of the British and Canadian Mid-Ocean Escort Force were not fast enough to maneuver with these convoys.

Loaded ships eastbound

Nine tankers departed Curaçao as convoy CU 1 on 20 March 1943 and arrived in Liverpool on 1 April. Additional sailings from Curaçao were CU 2 in June, CU 3 in July, CU 4 in September, and CU 6 in November. Convoy CU 5 was the first to originate in New York on 13 October 1943.  Approximately three or four CU convoys sailed from New York each month from December 1943 through May 1945. Convoys CU 23, CU 24, CU 28, CU 30, CU 33, and CU 35 included troopships and are sometimes identified with a TCU prefix. Convoy CU 24 sailed in two sections with troopships in TCU 24A and ammunition ships in TCU 24B.

A total of 2255 ships crossed the Atlantic in CU convoys until convoy CU 73 made the last departure from New York on 30 May 1945.

Submarines sank three loaded United States tankers from CU convoys:
  torpedoed Seakay in convoy CU 17 on 19 March 1944.
  torpedoed Pan-Pennsylvania in convoy CU 21 on 16 April 1944.
  torpedoed Jacksonville in convoy CU 36 on 30 August 1944.

Ballasted empty ships westbound
Empty ships travelling westbound on similar routes were designated UC convoys. This was the only UC convoy successfully attacked by submarines.

The surviving tankers arrived in Curaçao on 6 March and the freighters proceeded to South African and Indian Ocean destinations.

Additional sailings direct to Curaçao were UC 2 in April, UC 3 in June, UC 3A in July, and UC 4 in September. Convoy UC 5 Departed Liverpool 29 October 1943 as the first of the series routed to New York. Convoy UC 37 reached New York on 23 September 1944. Most subsequent convoys of the series sailed in two sections. Convoy UC 38A left Liverpool on 19 September 1944, and convoy UC 38B departed 4 days later. Convoy UC 71 departed Liverpool on 3 June 1945 as the last of the series.

Notes

References

 
 
 Arnold Hague : The Allied Convoy System 1939–1945 (2000).  ISBN (Canada) 1 55125 033 0 . ISBN (UK) 1 86176 147 3
 
 
 

North Atlantic convoys of World War II
Battle of the Atlantic
Naval battles and operations of World War II involving the United Kingdom